Kayak Point is a census-designated place (CDP) located in Snohomish County, Washington, United States. The CDP was newly defined by the United States Census Bureau in 2013. The population was 1,737 as of 2013 estimates.

It is home to Kayak Point County Park as well as a golf course.

Geography
Lake Cassidy is located at coordinates  (48.142508, -122.342276).

According to the United States Census Bureau, the CDP has a total area of 5.485 square miles (14.2 km²), of which, 5.474 square miles (14.2 km²) of it is land and 0.011 square miles (0.03 km²) of it (0.20%) is water.

References

Census-designated places in Snohomish County, Washington